The broadstripe shiner (Pteronotropis euryzonus) is a species of cyprinid fish  endemic to the Chattahoochee River drainage in the states of Georgia and Alabama in the United States. It is recorded in freshwater and lives in a benthopelagic environment. The climate that they are known to be found in is temperate. The distribution of this species is within North America and in the middle Chattahoochee River drainage. They occupy clay, sand and bedrock pools of headwaters, creeks, and small rivers.   It is common to find this species within the vegetation. The average length of the broadstripe shiner as an unsexed male is about 7 centimeters or about 2 inches.

References

Notes
 

Pteronotropis
Cyprinid fish of North America
Fish of the United States
Fish described in 1955